The Pride of Baltimore was a reproduction of a typical early 19th-century "Baltimore clipper" topsail schooner. This was a style of vessel made famous by its success as a privateer commerce raider, a small warship in the War of 1812 (1812–1815) against British merchant shipping and the world-wide British Royal Navy. After the end of the war, Baltimore Clippers did not have sufficient cargo capacity for normal merchant trade, so some were used in the illegal opium trade into China and vessels of the same type were used in the transatlantic slave trade from Africa.

Pride of Baltimore was commissioned on 1 May 1977 by the 44th Mayor of Baltimore, William Donald Schaefer, in an elaborate public ceremony in the historic Inner Harbor watched by thousands of Baltimoreans and Marylanders. She spent nine years at sea logging over 150,000 miles, equivalent to traveling six times around the globe. On 14 May 1986, the first Pride of Baltimore was lost at sea in the Caribbean, and her captain and three of the crew died.

The Pride of Baltimore II was commissioned as the successor and memorial to the Pride in 1988, sailing in the same Goodwill Ambassador role for the city of Baltimore, but its role has now expanded to also representing the State of Maryland and the "Land of Pleasant Living" in the Chesapeake Bay region. Pride II has sailed nearly 200,000 miles and visited over 200 ports in 40 countries in its now near three decades of voyages.

Chasseur: The inspiration for the Pride of Baltimore

The Pride of Baltimore was built as an authentic reproduction of an early nineteenth-century "Baltimore clipper" topsail schooner. It was not patterned after any particular vessel, but was rather designed as a typical "Baltimore Clipper" of the type in its heyday. It was indirectly named for the Baltimore-built topsail schooner Chasseur sailed by the privateer captain Thomas Boyle; Chasseur was known as the "Pride of Baltimore" and participated in the War of 1812 (1812–1815).

One of the most famous of the American privateers, Captain Thomas Boyle sailed Chasseur out of Baltimore's waterfront historic neighborhood of Fells Point, where she had been launched from Thomas Kemp's shipyard in 1812. On his first voyage as master of Chasseur in 1814, Boyle sailed east to the British Isles, where he harassed British shipping and sent a notice to King George III by way of a captured merchant vessel declaring that the entire British Isles were under naval blockade by Chasseur alone. Despite its implausibility, this boast caused the British Admiralty to recall many warships of the Royal Navy back to the home waters from the Napoleonic Wars in Europe and more intense real blockade on the American east coast to guard merchant shipping in convoys. Chasseur captured or sank 17 vessels before returning home to Baltimore on 25 March 1815, three months after a peace treaty in Ghent, United Netherlands had been signed ending the War of 1812.  Perhaps its most famous accomplishment was the capture of the schooner HMS St Lawrence.

On the Chasseur'''s return to Baltimore, the national newspaper published in the city, Niles Weekly Register dubbed the vessel, her captain, and crew the "pride of Baltimore" for their achievement.
 
After the end of the War of 1812, Chasseur was engaged in the China trade. Baltimore clippers were one of the types of clippers used to smuggle opium into China —- a trade which was both illegal and highly lucrative. Other Baltimore Clippers, made redundant by the end of the war and of limited cargo carrying capacity, became engaged in the slave trade from Africa.

Pride of Baltimore

 Baltimore’s Renaissance Begins 
In 1975, after many years of slow decay and decline, Baltimore was struggling to reinvent itself as the center of business and commerce that the city had been previously. The old municipal piers 1 through 6 along East Pratt Street around the north shore of the former "Basin" of the Northwest Branch of the Patapsco River, now rechristened "Inner Harbor" had been cleared in 1971 of their warehouses and buildings and rebuilt and by 1974, a new Pier 1, renamed "Constellation Dock" was constructed providing a new centerpiece home for the ancient warship sloop USS Constellation of 1854 to be moored and anchored for future visitors. A brick sidewalk promenade was built around the water's edge on the new extended bulkheads on the west shores along rerouted and rebuilt Light and South Calvert Streets, and the south shore below landmark Federal Hill Park, and running down the sides of the Pratt Street Piers 1–6. Citizens were beginning to discover, especially after the "Operation Sail" event of visiting sailing "tall ships" for the American Bicentennial celebration in the summer of 1976, that the harbor could become a magnet for people and recreation, as it had once been a magnet for shipping and trade. But something was still missing—a symbol, a trademark, an icon to link Baltimore to its harbor.

City officials cast about for possibilities and an idea eventually emerged that captured the theme. Former Mayor, Governor and Comptroller William Donald Schaefer credits then city Housing Commissioner Robert "Bob" Embrey with the idea "Let's build a ship in the Inner Harbor to draw folks downtown." With that seminal thought, a great sailing adventure and tradition was launched that would soon catapult Baltimore back into the imagination of the nation and the world as the home of adventurous seamen and romantic ships. A name was soon selected, a choice so natural as to be almost automatic: Pride of Baltimore. The name captured the spirit of the phoenix-like town. It also tapped into its maritime heritage since "Pride of Baltimore" was the nickname of the "Chasseur", the largest and boldest of the legendary, Baltimore-built topsail schooners known as "Baltimore clippers" that participated in the War of 1812, the second conflict with the British, that first launched the city as a commercial and maritime center.

Construction and service
In 1975, the City of Baltimore adopted a proposal from Charles Center-Inner Harbor Management for the construction of a replica sailing vessel as a centerpiece of the redevelopment of its Inner Harbor. The city requested proposals for "an authentic example of an historic Baltimore Clipper" to be designed and built using "construction materials, methods, tools, and procedures... typical of the period."

A topsail schooner design by Thomas Gillmer was chosen, and master shipwright Melbourne Smith oversaw the construction of the vessel next to the Maryland Science Center on the western shoreline of the Inner Harbor (the historic former "Basin" of the Northwest Branch of the Patapsco River / Baltimore Harbor and Port). During construction, residents and visitors/tourists could watch the craftsmen working with tools and techniques of two centuries earlier. Congresswoman Barbara Mikulski of Baltimore, (who grew up in Fells Point, the nearby waterfront neighborhood where many Baltimore clippers were built 180 years earlier), performed the launching ceremonies on 27 February 1977, only 10 months after the start of construction. Mayor William Donald Schaefer commissioned the Pride of Baltimore on behalf of the citizens of the city of Baltimore and the state of Maryland, two months later on 1 May 1977.

The Pride sailed over  during its nine years of service, visiting ports along the Eastern Seaboard from Newfoundland to the Florida Keys, the Great Lakes of North America, the Caribbean Sea and the West Coast along the Pacific Ocean from Mexico to British Columbia in Canada.  Itvisited European ports across the Atlantic Ocean in the North Sea, the Baltic Sea and the Mediterranean Sea.

Sinking
Winds of  hit the vessel, capsizing and sinking it. Its captain and three crew died; the remaining eight crewmembers floated in a partially inflated life-raft for four days and seven hours with little food or water until the Norwegian tanker Toro came upon them and rescued them.

A memorial on Rash Field in Baltimore's Inner Harbor memorializes the Pride's captain,  Armin Elsaesser 42, and crewmembers Vincent Lazarro, 27, engineer; Barry Duckworth, 29, carpenter; and Nina Schack, 23, seaman.

Pride of Baltimore II

 Origins 
After the sinking of the original Pride in May 1986, the Board of Directors of the non-profit public-private agency that operated Pride for the city were reluctant to build a replacement, but an outpouring of unsolicited financial support from the public encouraged the Board into going forward with a new ship. By late summer of 1986, plans for a replacement were under way. The ship was to be named Pride of Baltimore II and serve as a sailing memorial to the original Pride. It was to be another "Baltimore Clipper" topsail schooner that would continue the mission of the first ship. With an insurance payment of just under $500,000, along with a state grant of $1 million, and various contributions from private citizens, students, corporations, and foundations of over $2.5 million, sufficient funds were available to build a new ship and endow an operating fund.

 Construction and service 
Thomas Gillmer was once again commissioned as designer and supervising architect. Peter Boudreau, one of the builders and captains of the original vessel, was named as master shipwright and builder. Guided by the experience of the original Pride, the Board determined that this vessel could better fulfill the mission of globe-trotting ambassador that had evolved over the years if it was larger and had more cruising range both under sail and under power. It was also determined that Pride II would have additional modern safety features so as to be licensed by the United States Coast Guard as a subchapter "T" vessel approved for carrying passengers. With these guidelines in hand, designer Gillmer set out to create a new Pride that would look much like the original on the outside but have more contemporary amenities and safety features below deck.

Like the original Pride, the Pride II is not a replica of a specific vessel, and, although it represents a type of vessel known as a "Baltimore Clipper",  it was built to contemporary standards for seaworthiness and comfort but like its predecessor, is a topsail schooner. On 3 May 1987, the keel was laid in Baltimore's Inner Harbor, and Pride of Baltimore II soon began to take shape in the temporary shipyard set up along the waterfront with its progress watched and monitored by thousands of daily tourists and citizen visitors. The keel and all the other framing and planking materials were shaped out of Central American hardwoods from Belize. On this ship, modern power tools and techniques were used to speed construction. When onlookers periodically opined that "Them 19th century shipbuilders sure didn't use no kinda power tools," shipwright Leroy Suroski correctly pointed out, "They woulda if they woulda had 'em." Built in the iconic "Baltimore Clipper" style, Pride II has heavily raked masts, and has 10 sails, she carries two large gaff sails (one on a boom and one loose-footed), a main gaff topsail, three headsails, and a square topsail and flying topgallant on the foremast. Also rare on modern traditional sailing vessels, it flies studding sails (stun's'ls), additional sails set along the edge of the square topsail and the gaff mainsail on temporary spars known as stun's'l booms. Pride II also carries a very unusual sail known as a ring-tail, set like a studding sail off the main boom and main gaff.

Over two decades later in its storied career, on 5 September 2005, the Pride of Baltimore II suffered a complete dismasting while sailing in a squall in the Bay of Biscay off the western coast of France. The ship returned to port under motor power for repairs and spent over four months rebuilding the rig in St. Nazaire, France.

Until 2010, the Pride of Baltimore II'' was owned by the citizens of the state of Maryland and operated by Pride of Baltimore, Inc., a private, nonprofit organization. Ownership was transferred to the ship's nonprofit operator with unanimous approval by Maryland's state governmental Board of Public Works on 9 June 2010.

See also
 List of schooners

References

Other sources

External links

Sail Baltimore

Individual sailing vessels
Baltimore Clipper
Schooners
Tall ships of the United States
Sail training ships
Two-masted ships
Replica ships
1977 ships
Maritime incidents in 1986
1988 ships
Culture of Baltimore
Privateer ships of the United States
Sailboat type designs by Thomas C. Gillmer